The 2010 Khorasan shootout occurred on January 2, 2010 when Iranian police executing a drug raid were fired upon by drug smugglers near the Iran-Afghanistan border. At least 10 Iranian police were killed; 7 died at the scene and three more died later as a result of injuries sustained during the shooting.

It was Iran's deadliest drug smuggling related shootout in recent years. Reports also indicated that 4 additional Iranian policemen were also seriously injured in the shootout, and two drug smugglers were killed.

See also
Opium production in Afghanistan
CIA and Contras cocaine trafficking in the US

References

Mass shootings in Iran
Mass murder in 2010
Deaths by firearm in Iran
Organized crime conflicts
2010 murders in Iran